China completed at the Deaflympics for the first time way back in 1989. Since then, China has been regularly participating at the Deaflympics. China won its first Deaflympics medal also in 1989. China has competed at the Winter Deaflympics in 2007 and in 2015.

Medals

Source:

Medals by Summer Games

Medals by Winter Games

See also 
China at the Paralympics
China at the Olympics

References 

Nations at the Deaflympics
Parasports in China
China at multi-sport events
Deaf culture in China